Serena Dandini is an Italian television host, writer and author.

Life 
She was born in Rome. She studied at Giulio Cesare school  and Sapienza University of Rome.

From the early 1980s, she collaborated with RAI on television and radio programs. She is the creator on Radio 2 of The Life of Mae West, where she worked with Laura Betti.

In 1995 she hosted the Sanremo Music Festival 1995, with Luciano De Crescenzo, Fabio Fazio and Gianni Ippoliti

Beginning in 2001 she was artistic director of the Teatro Ambra Jovinelli in Rome. She was on the jury of the Sanremo Music Festival 2013.

Since the 2004, she has been hosting her first talk show on Raitre, Parla con me, conceived with the journalist Andrea Salerno and together with a group of authors.

She was the host of The States General, a satire television show, which returned in 2019.

She is the author of "Vieni avanti, cretina", and Sisters Don't Sleep, about gender-based violence.

Works 

 Lorenzo e la maturità. Come secernere agli esami, con Corrado Guzzanti, Milano, BUR senzafiltro, 2005, ISBN 88-17-00584-3.
 Amo, con Neri Marcorè, Milano, BUR senzafiltro, 2006, ISBN 88-17-00938-5.
 Parla con me. on Dvd, Milano, BUR, 2007, ISBN 978-88-17-01699-5.
 L'ottavo nano. on 5 Dvd (versione integrale del programma), Milano, BUR, 2009, ISBN 978-88-17-02379-5.
 Dai diamanti non nasce niente. Storie di vita e di giardini, Milano, Rizzoli, 2011, ISBN 978-88-17-04867-5.
 Grazie per quella volta. Confessioni di una donna difettosa, Milano, Rizzoli, 2012, ISBN 978-88-17-05818-6.
 Ferite a morte, collaborazione ai testi e alle ricerche di Maura Misiti, Milano, Rizzoli, 2013, ISBN 978-88-17-06561-0.
 Il futuro di una volta, Milano, Rizzoli, 2015, ISBN 978-88-17-07268-7.
 Avremo sempre Parigi. Passeggiate sentimentali in disordine alfabetico, Milano, Rizzoli, 2016, ISBN 978-88-17-09020-9.
 Il catalogo delle donne valorose, Milano, Rizzoli, 2018, ISBN 978-88-0468-765-8.
 La vasca del Führer, Torino, Einaudi, 2020, ISBN 978-88-06-24282-4.

References 

1954 births
Living people
Italian television presenters
Italian women writers